Raul Francisco dos Santos Moreira (born 2 March 1934) is a retired Portuguese footballer who played as a defender.

External links 
 
 
 Belenenses.Blogspot 

1934 births
Association football defenders
C.F. Os Belenenses players
Portugal international footballers
Portuguese footballers
Primeira Liga players
Living people